Gigi Fernández and Natasha Zvereva were the defending champions but lost in the final after they were forced to retire at 6–4, 4–1 against Lori McNeil and Arantxa Sánchez Vicario.

Seeds
Champion seeds are indicated in bold text while text in italics indicates the round in which those seeds were eliminated. The top four seeded teams received byes into the second round.

Draw

Final

Top half

Bottom half

External links
 1994 Family Circle Cup Doubles draw

Charleston Open
1994 WTA Tour